Events during the year 1966 in Northern Ireland.

Incumbents
 Governor - 	The Lord Erskine of Rerrick
 Prime Minister - Terence O'Neill

Events
17 April - In Belfast, the Easter Rising is commemorated by large republican parades.
26 June - Ulster Volunteer Force engages in three sectarian murders.
23 November - By-election for the Parliament of Northern Ireland in the Queen's University of Belfast constituency, the last election prior to the seat's abolition in 1969. Robert Porter (Ulster Unionist Party) wins.
Divis Tower in Belfast is built.

Arts and literature
 Seamus Heaney's first poetry collection, Death of a Naturalist.
 Ulster Orchestra founded in Belfast by the Arts Council of Northern Ireland, with Maurice Miles as its first principal conductor and János Fürst as leader.

Sport

Football
Irish League
Winners: Linfield

Irish Cup
Winners: Glentoran 2 - 0 Linfield

Births
3 January - Martin Galway, composer for games.
24 January - Jimeoin, comedian and actor.
8 March - Enda Gormley, Gaelic footballer.
25 March - Anton Rogan, footballer.
16 August - Barry McElduff, Sinn Féin MLA.
30 August - Peter Cunnah, singer and songwriter.
12 October - Brian Kennedy, singer, Eurovision song contestant and writer.
28 October - Jules Maxwell, songwriter and composer.
16 November - Paul Millar, footballer and football manager.
12 December - Ian Paisley, Jr., Democratic Unionist Party MLA.
20 December - Dekker Curry, cricketer.
27 December - Henry Downey, Derry GAA hurler and Gaelic footballer.
John McCrea, comic artist.
Cathy Wilkes, multimedia artist.

Deaths
28 March - Patrick McCartan, Sinn Féin MP and TD, member of 1st Dáil, a founder member of Clann na Poblachta (born 1878).
1 April - Brian O'Nolan, novelist, satirist and humorist (born 1911).
Sydney Sparkes Orr, Professor of Philosophy at the University of Tasmania (born 1914).

See also
1966 in Scotland
1966 in Wales

References

 
Northern Ireland